A Private Cosmos (1968) is a science fiction novel by American author Philip José Farmer. It is the third in his World of Tiers series.

Plot summary
Third novel World of Tiers featuring Earth-born Kickaha. Jadawin and his wife have disappeared, leaving the World of Tiers threatened by invasion and chaos. Human bodies taken over by Lord minds are pouring through uncharted gates. They seek two things: domination of every private cosmos, and the death of the Trickster, who knows too much.

References

External links
  
 A Private Cosmos, worldcat.org

See also
Simulated reality in fiction

1968 American novels
American science fiction novels
Novels by Philip José Farmer
Ace Books books